Miaohephyton is a carbonaceous compression fossil of a thalloid organism that has been interpreted as a brown alga.

The organism grew both by apical growth (leading to bifurcation) and intercalary growth (increasing the distances between nodes).  Some specimens are smooth, whereas others bear rounded structures that are interpreted as conceptacles.

References 

Enigmatic algae taxa
Enigmatic bikont taxa
Ediacaran life